"Mega Mix" is a 1992 single by German band Boney M. It returned the group to the UK Top 10 for the first time since 1979, peaking at #7, and was also a hit single in the rest of Europe and launched a Boney M. revival with the subsequent compilation album Gold - 20 Super Hits (in the UK: The Greatest Hits). The German 12" and CD single included a new remix of the 1983 recording "I Need a Babysitter" (previously only released in Spain and Portugal) while the UK edition was backed by the new remix of the group's 1978 chart-topper "Mary's Boy Child / Oh My Lord".
While the original members were no longer together, lead singer Liz Mitchell's line-up with Carol Grey, Patricia Foster and Curt Dee Daran did the promotion for the single and album.

Single releases
Germany
7"
 "Megamix" - 3:51 / "Bang Bang Lulu" (Farian) - 3:01 (BMG / MCI 74321 12606 7, 1992)

12"
 "Mega Mix" (Long Version) - 6:12 / "Babysitter" (Remix) (Allegue, Mahjun, Farian, Courage) - 3:48 / "Mega Mix" (Radio Version) - 3:51 / "Bang Bang Lulu" - 3:01 (BMG / MCI 74321 12606 1, 1992)

CD
 1. "Mega Mix" (Radio Version) - 3:51 / 2. "Mega Mix" (Long Version) - 6:12 / 3. "Bang Bang Lulu" - 3:01 / 4. "Babysitter" (Remix) - 3:48 (BMG / MCI 74321 12606 2, 1992)

UK
7"
 "Megamix" - 3:51 / "Mary's Boy Child / Oh My Lord" (Remix '92) (Hairston, Lorin, Farian, Jay) - 3:58 (Arista 74321 12512 7)

12"
 "Megamix" (Long Version) - 6:12 / "Mary's Boy Child / Oh My Lord" (Remix '92) - 3:58 / "Megamix" (Radio Version) - 3:51 (Arista 74321 12512 1)

CD
 "Megamix" (Radio Version) - 3:51 / "Mary's Boy Child / Oh My Lord" (Remix '92) - 3:58 / "Megamix" (Long Version) - 6:12 (Arista 74321 12512 2)

Sources
http://www.rateyourmusic.com/artist/boneym

Boney M. songs
1992 songs
Hansa Records singles